Simon Aspelin and Massimo Bertolini were the defending champions and competed with different partners this year, but were both eliminated by Mahesh Bhupathi and Jonas Björkman. Aspelin (teaming up with Todd Perry) lost in the final, while Bertolini (teaming up with Robbie Koenig) was eliminated at the quarterfinals.

Mahesh Bhupathi and Jonas Björkman won the title by defeating Simon Aspelin and Todd Perry 4–6, 7–6(7–2), 7–6(8–6) in the final.

Seeds

Draw

Draw

References

External links
 Main Draw (ATP)
 ITF tournament profile

Swedish Open
2004 ATP Tour
Swedish